Cracker is the debut studio album by American rock band Cracker. It was released on March 10, 1992, by Virgin.

The album had sold more than 200,000 copies by April 1994. "Teen Angst (What the World Needs Now)" was released as a single and charted at number 1 on the U.S. Modern Rock Tracks.

Critical reception
Trouser Press wrote: "On Cracker, Lowery strips rock down to its muscular essence, avoiding any of the fancy flourishes Camper Van Beethoven used that might have hurt — or strengthened — this album of catchy, clever and disarmingly ironic songs."

Track listing
 "Teen Angst (What the World Needs Now)" (David Lowery) – 4:11
 "Happy Birthday to Me" (Lowery)– 3:29
 "This Is Cracker Soul" (Lowery, Johnny Hickman) – 3:38
 "I See the Light" (Hickman, Lowery, Davey Faragher) – 5:11
 "St. Cajetan" (Lowery, Hickman) – 5:22
 "Mr. Wrong" (Hickman) – 4:34
 "Someday" (Lowery, Hickman, Faragher) – 3:19
 "Can I Take My Gun to Heaven?" (Lowery, Hickman) – 3:59
 "Satisfy You" (Lowery, Hickman) – 3:27
 "Another Song About the Rain" - (Hickman, Chris LeRoy) – 5:46
 "Don't Fuck Me Up (With Peace and Love)" (Lowery, Hickman) – 3:08
 "Dr. Bernice" (Lowery) – 6:20

Personnel
Listed as INGREDIENTS on the liner notes.
 David Lowery – vocals, acoustic guitar
 Johnny Hickman – electric guitars, backing vocals, harmonica, lead vocals (track 10)
 Davey Faragher – bass, backing vocals
with:
Rick Jaeger – drums
Jim Keltner - drums (tracks 2, 3 & 6)
 Benmont Tench - keyboards
 Jeanie McClain - backing vocals (tracks 4 & 5)
 Phil Jones - percussion
 Alicia Previn aka Lovely Previn - fiddle

Notes 

1992 debut albums
Cracker (band) albums
Virgin Records albums